Kapljišče is a small settlement in the Municipality of Metlika in the White Carniola area of southeastern Slovenia, close to the border with Croatia on the left bank of the Kolpa River. The area is part of the traditional region of Lower Carniola and is now included in the Southeast Slovenia Statistical Region.

References

External links
Kapljišče on Geopedia

Populated places in the Municipality of Metlika